Shri Katyayani Baneshwar Temple (Kannada:ಶ್ರೀ  ಕಾತ್ಯಾಯಿನಿ ಬಾಣೇಶ್ವರ ದೇವಸ್ತಾನ),(Sanskrit:श्री क़ात्यायनी बाणेश्व् र मन्दिर), or the Aversa Hindu Narayani is a Hindu temple in the coastal town of Aversa near Ankola,  in the Uttara Kannada district of Karnataka.

This is the only temple from Goa, to be relocated to Aversa with all the original idols of the main deities of Shree Katyayani, Shree Baneshwar, Shri Grampurush, Shri Nirakar, Shri Rampurush, Shri Kalabhairav, Shri Daad and all other temple deities during the Portuguese invasion. The idol of Katyayani is known for having a tilted head just like the Navadurga Devi located in Madkai (Goa).

The taluka headquarters at Ankola is at 10 km away and district headquarters in Karwar is at a distance of 25 km from the temple.  Nearest railway station is of Konkan Railway Corporation Limited at Harwada at distance of 2 km.  Main railway station at Karwar is at a distance of 28 km.  Nearest port is at Karwar. The Dabolim Airport of Goa is the nearest airport to the temple at a distance of 120 km.  The airport at Mangalore is at a distance of about 250 km from the temple.

Shri Katyayani is the Kuladevi (Kuladevata) (Family Deity) to many Konkani Gaud Saraswat Brahmins, Saraswat Brahmins, Daivajnya Brahmins and Konkani Kharvis.and some Kharvi subcaste people

According to the customs of this temple, Pooja’s are performed first to Shri Katyayani and then to Shri Baneshwar and then to Shri Ganapati (Ganesh).

The other deities worshipped are Sri Grama Purush, Sri Rama Purush, Sri Nirakar, Sri Kalabhairav and Sri Daad. The idol of Sri Ganapati is at the entrance of the shrine of Sri Baneshwar.

The temple is managed by Shri Katyayani Baneshwar Temple Trust. The temple complex is run on solar energy.

Avatar or Incarnation of Devi Shri Katyayani
 
Noting from prevalent records (Shri Durga Sapthashathi)The demon King Mahishasura after intense penance (Tapas) of years received indomitable powers from Lord Shiva. Power intoxicated him with such great arrogance that he started disturbing the Rishis in their holy rituals and attacking the Gods. When he defeated Lord Indra and captured his capital Amaravati, Fearing his might and insolence, the Rishis and Gods approached Brahma, Rudra and Lord Narayana and narrated their predicament. As Lord Maha Vishnu heard the details of Mahishasura’s misdeeds his calm face turned fierce and an intense cosmic ray of light (Divya Jyothi) emanated from his face. Similar cosmic rays of light emanated from the faces of Brahma and Rudra. These rays of celestial/ cosmic lights merged and in its brilliance the divine form of Shri Devi Goddess was seen.

Each of the Gods offered their might to HER. Rudra gave his Trishula, Vishnu his Chakra, Varuna his Conch and Vayu his Bow and Arrow. Agni gave his Shastayudha, Yama the Kaladanda, Indra his Vajrayudha & Airavatha, Jaldipathi hands his pasha, Brahmma the lotus flower, Ksheerasagara gives a white garland, white dress, Chudamani, ear rings, the crescent moon necklace and anklets. The Sea God offered a garland of lotus flowers and the Himalayas transformed into a lion (Vahana) to SRI DEVI.

This phenomenon was witnessed by a sage called Katyayana. He was a worshipper of SRI DEVI and cherished the desire of her being born as his daughter. Witnessing the incarnation made him change his desire of having HER as his daughter. His devotion intensified and he became one with HER. The Puranas reveal that the divine Goddess highly pleased with this devotion named herself after him as Katyayani.

History of Saraswat Brahmin and Goud Saraswat Brahmins

The Skanda Puranas mention that Saraswat Brahmins habituated North vindyagiri (Kashmir). They resided on the banks of the Saraswati River. Historical records/ narration state that members of this clan were well educated, highly intelligent people with exceptional cultural and social backgrounds. It is the popular belief that the Vedas and many other holy scriptures of the Hindus originated on the banks of this sacred river.

As their population increased they were classified into five divisions based on their place of settlement.

1. Saraswats      -   those who lived along the banks of Saraswati River.
2. Kanya Kubjas   -   those who lived along the river Kanoj.
3. Gouds          -   those who lived on the banks of the southern Ganges
4. Utkalas        -   the people who lived in Orissa.
5. Mythilis       -   those who lived along the Mythila river in Bihar.

Severe drought and famine over a long spell of 12 years, struck the banks of the Saraswati River. The Saraswats were forced to migrate towards Gomantak, present Goa. The original inhabitants of South India, known as Dravidians, addressed these Saraswats as Gouds or people coming from the Goud providence of the northern part of the country. Thus the prefix Gouda Saraswat Brahmins which continues to this day.

Originally the Saraswats belonged to six holy lineages of Gothras
1. Dattatreya
2. Bharadwaja
3. Pala Deva
4. Apamanya
5. Madagala
6. Daumyayana

References in records show that over a long period of time, these six lineages (gotras) were further dived into 199 lineages’s spread amongst Saraswats all over India. At present, seven lineages (Gotras) are prevalent
1. Jamadagni
2. Bharadwaja
3. Atri
4. Kashyapa
5. Koundinya
6. Vaisa
7.Kaushik /Kausha
Majority of them are worshippers of Shiva and Shakthi under various names.

The history of the Temple

Having arrived in Gomantaka, the Saraswat and Goud Saraswat Brahmins chose Sashasti provinces (present Madgaon) for their settlement. They prospered and by nature being religious, turned their minds to their Kuladevata. This resulted in building a beautiful temple at Banavli where they worshipped Shri Katyayani and Shri Baneshwar and accompanying deities (Parivar Devathe) with customary rituals and traditions and all faith and devotion.

Eventually Gomantaka came under Portuguese invasion in the 16th century and brought along the missionaries. The fear of conversion forced Goud Saraswat and Saraswat Brahmins to migrate elsewhere.

Around the 15th/16th centuries the inhabitants of Belekeri used to frequent Goa for trade. The sad plight of the Saraswats under the Portuguese regime brought them to extend their support. Some Kulavee Mahajans along with temple priests and the idols of Gods, their ornaments and other artefacts of the temple, were transported by boat to Belekeri near Aversa by the Kharvi people (warrior class of that period). With the consent of BHUDEVI (Grama Devatha) and on a plot given by her, the Saraswats and Goud Saraswat Brahmins built a small temple at Aversa and continued their devotion.

The historical support of the Kharvi community at the time of need begun a grand ritual which is followed to this day. The Prasadam / Prasada Bhojana is served to seven families of the Kharvi community in front of the Shrine (Gudi) of Shree Grama Purusha on the full moon day in the month of ASHVINA (Ashvin Shudda Poornima). This is as a token of gratitude to the Kharvi community for their timely help.

The Legend of the present day temple

Once a rich merchant named Paulekar was transporting valuable merchandise in a big boat. Nearing Belekeri, his boat was caught in a squall and the craft ran aground on the shore. In spite of his best efforts, he could not set his boat afloat. Being a Kulavee of Shree Katyayani and disheartened by his plight, he came to the temple at Aversa. The night was pitch dark, no one was around, as the Pujari had completed his pooja rituals and gone home. From a small opening in the temple door, the light of the lamps lit within could be seen. The fragrance of camphor and sandal filled the air. The serenity and peacefulness of the atmosphere helped in calming the worried merchant and in this mood he prostrated before the Kulaswamini, narrated his difficulties and vowed to construct a temple in the shape of a boat if SRI DEVI extricated him from his troubles. He then returned to his boat and slept well. Towards dawn he had a dream that an eight-year-old girl pushing his boat with a large barge pole and setting it afloat. He awoke with a start and found it was not merely a dream but a reality. His boat was floating in the sea. As he contemplated, he was struck by the similarity between the face of the idol in the temple and the face of the little girl of his dreams. He was certain that Shri Katyayani had saved him from disaster. With joy in his heart and a deep sense of gratitude he went to the temple at Aversa, where a greater surprise awaited him. He saw the footprints marked with sand and was convinced beyond doubt that Shree Katyayani had saved his boat and merchandise. He stood before the Deity in all humility, offered pooja and vowed to build the temple as soon as possible and left the place.

Parulekar’s business transactions resulted in huge profits and all his time and energy went into the expanding of business and allied monetary gains. In the process he forgot his vow to the Goddess and the help rendered by Her. After a lapse of a few years, when his boat was passing near Belekeri, it suddenly came to a stop. This reminded him that he had not fulfilled his vow given to Sri Kuladevi. He hastened to Aversa and begged for forgiveness for his omissions. He then built the present temple which has a roof resembling an overturned boat.

References

External links
 http://www.shreekatyayani.org

Hindu temples in Uttara Kannada district